Richard John Frizzell  (born 1943) is a New Zealand artist known for his pop art paintings and prints. His work often features Kiwiana iconography combined with motifs from Māori art traditions, such as the tiki and tā moko. He is based in Auckland. 

Frizzell does not stay within one particular style, and often adopts unfashionable painting styles. Thus, he can be compared to artists such as Roy Lichtenstein, Paul Hartigan, Ian Scott, and Andy Warhol. Frizzell's best-known work uses as its base the "Four Square man", an advertising character for the Four Square grocery chain. 

Frizzell is also responsible for the lithograph 'Mickey to Tiki, Tu Meke'. This has now become a best selling print in New Zealand. It portrays a cartoon 'Mickey Mouse' changing in stages to a 'tiki.' This image is used on a popular tee-shirt, released by the Christchurch Art Gallery. Frizzell has become a point of discussion on indigenous art and the misuse of symbols.

Career

Frizzell trained at the Ilam School of Fine Arts of the University of Canterbury from 1960 to 1963, studying under artists such as Rudi Gopas and Russell Clark. After this he worked in advertising for many years, and it is through this that he gained his appreciation for the advertising characters he uses in his work.

Frizzell's exhibition Tiki in November 1992 at Auckland's Gow Langsford Gallery aroused controversy for his series of paintings reworking the tiki image to resemble subjects as varied as Casper the Friendly Ghost and a Picasso abstract. The major retrospective Dick Frizzell: Portrait of a Serious Artiste of 1997 also attracted some controversy, somewhat due to the inclusion of Grocer with Moko (1992). This contentious work depicted the Four Square man with facial moko, which offended some viewers. 

Frizzell became known for his use of Tiki in his works. One of his famous pieces 'Goofy Tiki Study' is now in the care of the Auckland Art Gallery Toi o Tāmaki. 

Goofy Tiki Study is a Gouache and pencil on paper work, that depicts a stylised hei tiki with large lettering proclaiming “Goofy Tiki”. The work responds to the wealth of ‘low’ art produced for tourism that can be found all throughout New Zealand, that appropriates and exploits Māori art imagery while ignoring the deeper symbolism and cultural significance. In this work Frizzell is creating a study for a series of ‘low’ art paintings he created to fill the so-called void in the art world at the time. The works created by Frizzell became highly commercialised and widely spread through New Zealand, which spearheaded a new wave of appropriation to occur as once again it became popular to commandeer Māori imagery with little regard to the culture behind it. 

Frizzell has contributed designs to Esther Diamond linen company, has released several varieties of "Frizzell Wines," and designed the cover and several illustrations for The Great New Zealand Songbook (2009).

Frizzell wrote Dick Frizzell: The Painter (Random House NZ, 2009), with a foreword by art writer Hamish Keith. In 2012, he completed a series of paintings of poems by Sam Hunt. At the opening of the exhibition of those paintings on 7 February 2012, Frizzell said that he and Hunt had, in their respective paintings and poems, committed the ultimate "sin", the "sin of being understood".

Frizzell is represented by Gow Langsford Gallery in Auckland, the Central Art Gallery in Christchurch, and Milford Galleries in Dunedin and Queenstown.

In the 2004 Queen's Birthday Honours, Frizzell was appointed a Member of the New Zealand Order of Merit, for services to the arts.

Photorealistic art
Though he is best known for his iconoclastic cartoon-derived work, Frizzell has a second string to his artistic bow as a painter of photorealistic landscapes and still lifes. His landscapes, often views of rural New Zealand as seen from narrow country roads, have been the subject of several exhibitions, among them Out of Alex, at Dunedin's Milford Gallery in 2019.

Personal life
Frizzell is a brother of politician Steve Chadwick. Frizzell has three children, including Josh Frizzell, a  television and advertising director, and Otis Frizzell, an artist and half of hiphop music duo Slave & Otis.

References

External links
 Dick Frizzell in the collection of the Museum of New Zealand Te Papa Tongarewa
 Gow Langsford Gallery's Frizzell page
 Dick Frizzell to paint in Antarctica, New Zealand Antarctic Institute (Jan 2005)
 Adam Art Gallery, Victoria University of Wellington
 Janne Land Gallery, Wellington
 Ferner Galleries
 Milford Galleries
 Black Barn Gallery
 r h art: the gallery at Woollaston Estates

 
1943 births
Living people
20th-century New Zealand painters
20th-century New Zealand male artists
Ilam School of Fine Arts alumni
Members of the New Zealand Order of Merit
Pop artists